Tortrix fervida is a species of moth of the family Tortricidae. It is endemic to New Zealand and has been observed in both the North and South Islands. The larvae feed on species of fern in the genus Hymenophyllum including Hymenophyllum nephrophyllum. The adult moths are variable in appearance and are day flying. They are on the wing from November until January. This species is regarded as  being uncommon.

Taxonomy 
This species was first described by Edward Meyrick in 1901 using a male specimen collected by George Hudson in Kaitoke in November and named Cacoecia fervida. George Hudson discussed and illustrated this species in his 1928 book The butterflies and moths of New Zealand under the name Tortrix fervida. It is likely that this species belongs to another genus and as such this species is also known as Tortrix (s.l.) fervida. The male holotype specimen is held at the Natural History Museum, London.

Description 

The larvae of this species are approximately 1 cm long when mature, with a brown head and a darker green coloured body. They have tiny hair like structures to assist in keeping them dry when moving amongst the damp fronds of their host plants. 

Hudson described the adults of this species as follows:

Hudson pointed out that adults of this species can vary in colour with some male specimens having spaces between their forewing bands that are paler in colour.

Distribution
This species is endemic to New Zealand. It has been collected in both the North and South Islands including in Wellington, around Arthur's Pass and in the Southland region. It is regarded as uncommon.

Behaviour
The larvae make a silk tube in which they hide.  The adult moths fly during the day and are on the wing from November until January.

Host plants

The larval host plants of this species are in the genus Hymenophyllum and include Hymenophyllum nephrophyllum.

References

Moths described in 1901
Tortricini
Moths of New Zealand
Taxa named by Edward Meyrick
Endemic fauna of New Zealand
Endemic moths of New Zealand